Vredenburg Castle (Dutch: (Kasteel) Vredenburg or Vredeborch) was a 16th-century castle built by Habsburg emperor Charles V in the city of Utrecht in the Netherlands. Some remains of the castle, which stood for only 50 years, are still visible on what is now Vredenburg square in Utrecht.

History 
In 1528, the Holy Roman Empire annexed the Bishopric of Utrecht, and Emperor Charles V immediately ordered the construction of a castle in Utrecht, not only to protect the domain from invasion by the duke of Guelders, but also to retain control over the city's unruly population. Construction began in 1529 and was completed in 1532.

On 8 November 1576, the States General of the Seventeen Provinces ratified an agreement, known as the Pacification of Ghent, to remove Spanish occupying soldiers. In response the castle's Spanish garrison prepared to be besieged by the Dutch rebels, turning the castle's cannons towards the city itself.

By December, the siege was underway and fighting broke out between the Spanish and Dutch. However, the garrison abandoned the castle on 11 February 1577, following negotiations between garrison commander Francesco Fernando d'Avila and Maximilien de Hénin-Liétard, the count of Bossu, who served as temporary Dutch stadholder. The abandonment was part of a general withdrawal agreed upon by the new Governor-General Don Juan one day later, on 12 February.

The citizens of Utrecht demanded that the castle be demolished to prevent the Spanish or other foreign powers from dominating the city again in future. However, the city government opposed demolition, so as not to offend the emperor. On 2 May, the population took the matter into their own hands. According to legend, a group of local women led by Trijn van Leemput stormed the castle and Trijn gave the signal for the castle to be destroyed by removing the first bricks from the castle walls.

The demolition of the castle lasted until 1581. The two western towers remained standing, as they were part of the outer city walls. However, they were also demolished piece by piece in the following centuries; by 1919 they had completely disappeared. The foundations of Vredenburg castle were uncovered during archaeological excavations in 1976 and 1978.

Old prints and excavations

See also
Catharijne
List of castles in the Netherlands

Sources
 Kastelen in Utrecht (Dutch)
 De Dom Digitaal (Dutch)

External links 

  Vredenburg

Buildings and structures demolished in the 16th century
Castles in Utrecht (province)
Former castles
History of Utrecht (city)
Rijksmonuments in Utrecht (city)
Articles containing video clips
Former buildings and structures in the Netherlands